FC Energomash Belgorod was a Russian football team based in Belgorod. It was founded in 2014 after the previous Belgorod team FC Salyut Belgorod went bankrupt. For 2015–16 season, it advanced to the professional level, the third-tier Russian Professional Football League. It was dissolved after the 2017–18 season. Following that, FC Salyut Belgorod entered professional competition once again.

References

External links
  Official site

Association football clubs established in 2014
Association football clubs disestablished in 2018
Defunct football clubs in Russia
Sport in Belgorod
2014 establishments in Russia
2018 disestablishments in Russia